This is a comprehensive list of victories of the  cycling team. The races are categorized according to the UCI Continental Circuits rules. The team was in the UCI Continental category from 2015 to 2016 then up to UCI Professional Continental from 2017 till 2019. In 2020 the Team stepped up to the UCI World Tour.

2015 –  

Stage 4 Tour d'Azerbaïdjan, Daniel Turek
Stage 1 Tour de Berlin, Daniel Turek
GP Polski Via Odra, Bartosz Warchoł
 National Time Trial championship, Yoav Bear

2016 –  

 National Road Race championship, Dan Craven
Tour of Arad, Chris Butler
Hets Hatsafon / Northern Arrow, Guy Gabay
Stage 1 Tour de Beauce, Mihkel Räim
 National Time Trial championship, Aviv Yechezkel
 National Road Race championship, Guy Sagiv
 National Road Race championship, Luis Lemus
 National Road Race championship, Mihkel Räim
 Overall Tour de Hongrie, Mihkel Räim
Stage 1, Mihkel Räim
Stage 4, Chris Butler
Stage 1 Tour of Rwanda, Guillaume Boivin

2017 –  

Stage 1 Tour d'Azerbaïdjan, Mihkel Räim
Stage 5 Tour d'Azerbaïdjan, Krists Neilands
Stage 1 Okolo Slovenska, Mihkel Räim
 National Time Trial championship, Guy Sagiv
 National Road Race championship, Roy Goldstein 
 National Road Race championship, Krists Neilands 
Stage 4 Colorado Classic, Mihkel Räim
Stage 2 Baltic Chain Tour, Ben Perry
Prologue Tour of Taihu Lake, Guillaume Boivin

2018 –  

Stage 3 Tour de Taiwan, Edwin Ávila
 Overall Vuelta a Castilla y León, Rubén Plaza
Stage 2, Mihkel Räim
Stage 3, Rubén Plaza
Stage 4 Tour of Japan, Mihkel Räim
Stage 2 Tour de Korea, Mihkel Räim
Dwars door het Hageland, Krists Neilands
 National Time Trial championship, Omer Goldstein
 National Road Race championship, Roy Goldstein
 National Road Race championship, Krists Neilands 
 National Road Race championship, Mihkel Räim
 Overall Tour of Austria, Ben Hermans
Stage 3, Ben Hermans
Great War Remembrance Race, Mihkel Räim
Famenne Ardenne Classic, Guillaume Boivin

2019 –  

Stage 4 Tour of Rwanda, Edwin Ávila 
Classic Loire Atlantique, Rudy Barbier
 Overall GP Beiras e Serra da Estrela, Edwin Ávila
Stage 1, Edwin Ávila
 Overall Vuelta a Castilla y León, Davide Cimolai
Stages 1 & 2, Davide Cimolai
 National Time Trial championship, Matthias Brändle
 Overall Tour of Estonia, Mihkel Räim
Prologue, Matthias Brändle
Stage 1, Rudy Barbier
Stage 2, Mihkel Räim
 Overall Tour de Hongrie, Krists Neilands
Stages 2 & 4, Krists Neilands
Stage 3 Tour de Korea, Ben Perry
 National Time Trial championship, Guy Niv
 National Time Trial championship, Krists Neilands 
 National Road Race championship, Guy Sagiv
 Overall Tour of Austria, Ben Hermans
Stage 4, Ben Hermans
Stage 3 Tour de Wallonie, Davide Cimolai
 Overall Tour of Utah, Ben Hermans
Stages 2 & 3
Arnhem–Veenendaal Classic, Zak Dempster
Grand Prix de Wallonie, Krists Neilands
Prologue Tour of Taihu Lake, Matthias Brändle
Binche–Chimay–Binche, Tom Van Asbroeck

2020 –  

Stage 1 Vuelta a San Juan, Rudy Barbier
Stage 1 Tour of Antalya, Mihkel Räim
Le Samyn, Hugo Hofstetter
 National Road Race championship, Norman Vahtra
 National Time Trial championship, Matthias Brändle
Stage 4 Okolo Slovenska, Rudy Barbier
Stage 8 Giro d'Italia, Alex Dowsett
Stage 3 Vuelta a España, Dan Martin
 National Time Trial championship, Guy Sagiv
 National Road Race championship, Omer Goldstein

2021 –  

Stage 2 Tour des Alpes-Maritimes et du Var, Michael Woods
Stage 6 Tirreno–Adriatico, Mads Würtz Schmidt
Stage 1b (TTT) Settimana Internazionale di Coppi e Bartali
Stage 4 Tour de Romandie, Michael Woods
Trofeo Alcúdia – Port d'Alcúdia, André Greipel
Stage 4 Vuelta a Andalucía, André Greipel
Stage 17 Giro d'Italia, Dan Martin
 National Time Trial championship, Omer Goldstein
 National Time Trial championship, Matthias Brändle
 National Road Race championship, Mads Würtz Schmidt
Giro dell'Appennino, Ben Hermans
 Overall Arctic Race of Norway, Ben Hermans
Stage 3, Ben Hermans
Stage 4 (ITT) Tour Poitou-Charentes en Nouvelle-Aquitaine, Ben Hermans
 National Road Race championship, Guillaume Boivin
Stage 4 Okolo Slovenska, Itamar Einhorn
Tre Valli Varesine, Alessandro De Marchi

2022 –  

 Stage 2 O Gran Camiño, Michael Woods
  Overall Presidential Tour of Turkey, Patrick Bevin
Stage 7, Patrick Bevin
 Stage 3 Tour de Romandie, Patrick Bevin
 Mercan'Tour Classic, Jakob Fuglsang
 Stage 4 Tour de Suisse, Daryl Impey
  Overall Route d'Occitanie, Michael Woods
 Stage 3, Michael Woods
 National Time Trial championship, Omer Goldstein
 National Road Race championship, Itamar Einhorn
 Stage 5 Tour de France, Simon Clarke
 Stage 16 Tour de France, Hugo Houle
 Stage 1 Vuelta a Castilla y León, Giacomo Nizzolo
 Maryland Cycling Classic, Sep Vanmarcke
 Stage 1 Tour of Britain, Corbin Strong

Supplementary statistics
Sources

Notes

References

Israel–Premier Tech
Cycling teams established in 2015
ICA